The 1904 Grant football team represented the Chattanooga campus of  U.S. Grant Memorial University—now known as the University of Tennessee at Chattanooga—as an independent in the 1904 college football season.

Schedule

References

Grant
Chattanooga Mocs football seasons
Grant football